Mayoro N'Doye (born 18 December 1991) is a Senegalese professional footballer who plays as a central midfielder for  club Nancy.

Club career
On 23 June 2022, N'Doye signed with Nancy in the French third tier.

References

1991 births
Living people
Senegalese footballers
Association football midfielders
Ligue 1 players
Ligue 2 players
Championnat National players
FC Metz players
RC Strasbourg Alsace players
Tours FC players
Gazélec Ajaccio players
Red Star F.C. players
AS Nancy Lorraine players
Senegalese expatriate footballers
Expatriate footballers in France
Senegalese expatriate sportspeople in France